Alkalihalobacillus xiaoxiensis is a Gram-positive, slightly halophilic, endospore-forming, facultatively anaerobic, rod-shaped and motile bacterium from the genus of Alkalihalobacillus which has been isolated from forest soil from the Xiaoxi National Natural Reserve in China.

References

Bacillaceae
Bacteria described in 2011